Trypetisoma is a genus of flies in the family Lauxaniidae. There are more than 40 described species in Trypetisoma.

Species
Trypetisoma australe (Malloch, 1928)
Trypetisoma ballinae Kim, 1994
Trypetisoma bicincta (Meijere, 1910)
Trypetisoma caniventre (Bezzi, 1928)
Trypetisoma chauliodon Kim, 1994
Trypetisoma cirrhicauda (Bezzi, 1928)
Trypetisoma confusum (Malloch, 1940)
Trypetisoma corniculatum Kim, 1994
Trypetisoma costatum (Harrison, 1959)
Trypetisoma cotterense Kim, 1994
Trypetisoma cunnamullae Kim, 1994
Trypetisoma cylindratum Kim, 1994
Trypetisoma digitatum Kim, 1994
Trypetisoma echinatum Kim, 1994
Trypetisoma eutretoides Arnaud, 1968
Trypetisoma fenestrata (Meijere, 1910)
Trypetisoma guttatum (Tonnoir & Malloch, 1926)
Trypetisoma horizontale Kim, 1994
Trypetisoma hyalipunctum (Malloch, 1929)
Trypetisoma ilukae Kim, 1994
Trypetisoma leucostictum (Bezzi, 1928)
Trypetisoma lidgbirdense Kim, 1994
Trypetisoma lobion Kim, 1994
Trypetisoma macalpinei Kim, 1994
Trypetisoma magnum Kim, 1994
Trypetisoma major (Malloch, 1929)
Trypetisoma morio (Meijere, 1910)
Trypetisoma octopunctatum (Malloch, 1929)
Trypetisoma pulchripennis Shewell, 1977
Trypetisoma puncticeps (Malloch, 1929)
Trypetisoma rhamphis Kim, 1994
Trypetisoma rottnestense Kim, 1994
Trypetisoma samoaense (Malloch, 1929)
Trypetisoma scalenum Kim, 1994
Trypetisoma sentipeniculus Kim, 1994
Trypetisoma shewelli Arnaud, 1968
Trypetisoma steriphomorpha Kim, 1994
Trypetisoma sticticum (Loew, 1863)
Trypetisoma sumatrana (Malloch, 1927)
Trypetisoma tenuipenne (Malloch, 1930)
Trypetisoma tephritina (Meijere, 1914)
Trypetisoma tomentosum Kim, 1994
Trypetisoma tricincta (Malloch, 1927)
Trypetisoma trypetiformis (Meijere, 1910)
Trypetisoma uptoni Kim, 1994
Trypetisoma vulgare Kim, 1994
Trypetisoma zacatecasense Arnaud & Gelhaus, 1980

References

Further reading

External links

 

Lauxaniidae
Lauxanioidea genera
Taxa named by John Russell Malloch